This is a list of episodes for Season 1 of Late Night with Conan O'Brien, which aired from September 13, 1993, to September 9, 1994.

Series overview

Season 1

References

Episodes (season 01)
1993 American television seasons